Dmitry Ignatenko may refer to:

Dmitry Ignatenko (footballer, born 1969), Soviet and Russian footballer 
Dmitry Ignatenko (footballer born 1988), Belarusian footballer 
Dmitry Ignatenko (footballer born 1995), Belarusian footballer 
Dmytro Ihnatenko, Ukrainian figure skater